Joseph Henry Kirkwood Sr. (3 April 1897 – 29 October 1970) was a professional golfer who is acknowledged as having put Australian golf on the world map.

Born in Sydney, Australia, Kirkwood left home at age ten to work on a sheep station in the Australian Outback, where his boss introduced him to the game of golf. He developed his skills to the point where he could compete in his country's most important golf tournaments. Kirkwood won the 1920 Australian Open with a score of 290, 12 strokes better than the previous tournament record score. Later in 1920 he won the New Zealand Open.

Kirkwood's success led him to England and Europe where, in his first competition, he defeated the great Harry Vardon. He began playing on the professional tour in the United States in 1923, winning that year's Houston Invitational, and was the first Australian to win on what became the PGA Tour. In 1924, he was one of the top-ranked golfers on the tour with five victories, three of which were consecutive. Kirkwood remains co-holder of the record for the widest winning stroke margin in PGA Tour history, set at the 1924 Corpus Christi Open in Texas. That year he also teamed up with Walter Hagen to begin travelling around the globe putting on golf and trick-shot exhibitions, newsreels of which were sent back home to be shown in cinemas around the U.S.

Kirkwood's best performance in a major championship was a third-place finish in the PGA Championship in 1930, a semifinalist in the match play competition. He finished fourth in the British Open on three separate occasions. In 1933, he won the Canadian Open. He was apparently the first-ever golfer to tee off from the howdah atop a domesticated elephant, which he first did (and was photographed doing) at Royal Calcutta Golf Club in Calcutta in 1937, and soon after in other clubs in India, and later in Africa.

Over his lifetime in golf, Kirkwood is credited with scoring twenty-nine holes-in-one, two of which came in the same round. In his later years, he retired to the mountain resort community of Stowe, Vermont in New England, where he was the local teaching pro at the Stowe Country Club. The club has held the Joe Kirkwood Memorial Golf Tournament annually since 1967. Notably, Kirkwood's skills remained at a high level for most of his life and at age fifty-one, in 1948 he and his son Joe Kirkwood Jr. both made the cut at the U.S. Open, the first father and son to do so and a record tied only in 2004. When his son won the 1951 Blue Ribbon Open in Milwaukee, Wisconsin, they became the third father-son winners in the history of the PGA Tour, which by 2010 still has only seven such pairs of winners.

Joe Kirkwood Jr. became an actor who made a series of Hollywood films portraying the fictional boxer Joe Palooka.

One of Joe Kirkwood Sr.'s most remarkable feats was playing a round of golf at 10-under-par 62, "breaking his age" when 63 years old.

Kirkwood died at age 73 in 1970 in Burlington, Vermont. He was elected to the American Golf Hall of Fame at Foxburg, Pennsylvania. His autobiography, as told to Barbara Fey, was published posthumously in 1973 under the title Links of Life. In his honour, the annual winner of the Australian PGA Championship receives the Kirkwood Cup. He is buried in the West Branch Cemetery in Stowe.

Professional wins

PGA Tour wins (13)
1923 (5) California Open Championship, St. Augustine Open, Houston Invitational, Open Championship of Illinois, Kansas Mid-Continent Pro Championship (tie with Walter Hagen)
1924 (4) Texas Open, Houston Open, Philadelphia Open Championship, Corpus Christi Open
1930 (1) Long Beach Open (tie with Olin Dutra)
1931 (1) Southeastern Open
1933 (2) North and South Open, Canadian Open

Other wins
this list may be incomplete
1920 Australian Open, New Zealand Open, New Zealand Professional Championship
1922 McVitie & Price Tournament

Results in major championships

NYF = tournament not yet founded
NT = no tournament
WD = withdrew
CUT = missed the half-way cut
R32, R16, QF, SF = round in which player lost in PGA Championship match play
"T" indicates a tie for a place

Summary

Most consecutive cuts made – 11 (1921 Open Championship – 1926 Open Championship)
Longest streak of top-10s – 1 (nine times)

See also
List of golfers with most PGA Tour wins

References

External links
Australian Dictionary of Biography
Joe Kirkwood Memorial Golf Tournament

Australian male golfers
American male golfers
PGA Tour golfers
Golfers from Vermont
20th-century American memoirists
1897 births
1970 deaths